Fernández de la Cruz is a station on the Buenos Aires Premetro. It was opened on 29 April 1987 together with the other Premetro stations. The station is located in the Barrio of Villa Soldati in the vicinity of Sacachispas Fútbol Club.

References

Buenos Aires PreMetro stations
Buenos Aires Underground stations
Railway stations opened in 1987